Mawṣilī is an Arabic locational surname or nisba, which means a person from al-Mawṣil, Iraq. It may refer to:
al-Fath al-Mawsili
Ubayd Allah ibn al-Habhab al-Mawsili
Muhammad ibn Abi al-Wafa al-Mawsili
Ammar al-Mawsili
Ishaq al-Mawsili
Ibrahim al-Mawsili

Nisbas